Valsang is also known as ( BALSING )an Indian village situated between Solapur and Akkalkot. Swami Samartha Maharaj.The village has a dargah of yaseen saheb dating back five hundred years and people from all Muslim communities in the village celebrate the Urs program of Yasin Saheb Dargah with great enthusiasm.

The coordinates are:

This large village has a post office and a police station, the jurisdiction of which extends over thirty-six villages. There are three primary schools, one each with Marathi, Kannada and Urdu as medium of instruction and Shri Shankarling High School with both Marathi and Kannada as medium of instruction. The village is electrified. A weekly market is held in this village on every Wednesday. Wells are the main source of drinking water.

The old Sholapur District Gazetteer, 1884, describes the place to be a market town of some importance. It further states that " the town has a large dyeing and weaving industry, the yearly out-turn being estimated at about £10,000 (Rs. 1,00,000). This estimate includes the manufacture of indigo and surangi dyes, the dyeing with them of cotton thread and cloth, and of a cheap quality of silk called "panjam". Women's robes woven of this silk are well known in the Karnatak as Valsangacha Band and are worn by all classes except Brahmans. The industry is carried on by Koshtis and Bangars sometimes weaving and dyeing together and sometimes separate."

Cloth 
Formerly Indigo and sarangi dyeing was done with dyes mixed in water found in one of the wells in the village having some ingredients used in dyeing. The dyeing industry has decayed with the introduction of chemical dyes. Though some dyers are still found in the village, they have also adopted chemical processes. Weaving saris is a specialty of the weavers in the village and the occupation is not at present confined to any particular castes. The annual turn-over of the weavers including those in the co-operative fold as revealed by the local enquiries amounts to about six lakhs of rupees.

Valsang is a place of farms. This place is surrounded by the farms and small villages. To reach this place you can take a Govt. Its main agriculture product is paddy growing.

The Swami Samarth Suth Girni (cotton mill) is located on Akkakote Road. The main industry of the village is farming and small shops. Some people will work in Solapur and others do their farms. There is also Hutatma Smark in which old age people will gather and discuss. It was constructed by the Maharashtra government. This is located on the Solapur - Akkalkote Road.

Temples and fairs 
 Shankar Linga Jatra (Fair):- Once a Year there will be a Jatra, all people of the village celebrate the fair. In the evening there will be Nandi Kol (Long Holi Stick) where people will carry these Nandi kol and take round to whole village. On the next day there will be Pallaki Utsav of god statue & also there will be a play stage performance (Natak). After the fair there will be a free curry food (Kharbheli) people use to bring the rotti (Bread) from their home and use to eat the Curry. This will done by village young peoples who collect the money from people and make kharbeheli (curry).
 Chowdamma Devi Fair: This fair takes place in the month of May/June.Approximately 2–3 Lac people come from different places to attend the fair and take Darshan of the Devi Mata. The fair is pretty well known for its BalBatla which is the Kannada word for a plate containing fire. BalBatla is made up of silver and it is held by a person who is believed to take the form of Chowdamma Devi. During the fair, people follow him for the whole night. This Balbatla Jatra is covered live on Solapur Vruth darshan which is a local news channel for Solapur district.
 Shivjayanti is also celebrated on 19 Feb in this village, All youngsters will ride a statue of Shivaji around the village with music and celebrate the Shiv Jayanti.

Valsang Jattra
Valsang Jatra are festivals held in Valsang. This village hosts many fairs every year. The 4 main Jatra are Shankar Linga Jatra, Chowdeshwary and Basavvana Jatra and Siddeshwar Jatra.

Shankar Linga Jatra on this day young and old gather near the Temple and take the holy sticks (Nandi kol) and walk around the villages with lighting and music. On the next day a play is performed with abundance of people to make happen in very large scale.

References

Villages in Solapur district